In statistics, Mood's median test is a special case of Pearson's chi-squared test. It is a nonparametric test that tests the null hypothesis that the medians of the populations from which two or more samples are drawn are identical. The data in each sample are assigned to two groups, one consisting of data whose values are higher than the median value in the two groups combined, and the other consisting of data whose values are at the median or below. A Pearson's chi-squared test is then used to determine whether the observed frequencies in each sample differ from expected frequencies derived from a distribution combining the two groups.

Relation to other tests
The test has low power (efficiency) for moderate to large sample sizes. The Wilcoxon–Mann–Whitney U two-sample test or its generalisation for more samples, the Kruskal–Wallis test, can often be considered instead. The relevant aspect of the median test is that it only considers the position of each observation relative to the overall median, whereas the Wilcoxon–Mann–Whitney test takes the ranks of each observation into account.  Thus the other mentioned tests are usually more powerful than the median test. Moreover, the median test can only be used for quantitative data.

It is crucial to note, however, that the null hypothesis verified by the Wilcoxon–Mann–Whitney U (and so the Kruskal–Wallis test) is not about medians. The test is sensitive also to differences in scale parameters and symmetry. As a consequence, if the Wilcoxon–Mann–Whitney U test rejects the null hypothesis, one cannot say that the rejection was caused only by the shift in medians. It is easy to prove by simulations, where samples with equal medians, yet different scales and shapes, lead the Wilcoxon–Mann–Whitney U test to fail completely.

However, although the alternative Kruskal-Wallis test does not assume normal distributions, it does assume that the variance is approximately equal across samples. Hence, in situations where that assumption does not hold, the median test is an appropriate test. Moreover, Siegel & Castellan (1988, p. 124) suggest that there is no alternative to the median test when one or more observations are "off the scale."

See also
Sign test – a paired alternative to the median test.

References

 Corder, G.W. & Foreman, D.I. (2014). Nonparametric Statistics: A Step-by-Step Approach, Wiley. .
 Siegel, S., & Castellan, N. J. Jr. (1988, 2nd ed.).  Nonparametric statistics for the behavioral sciences.  New York: McGraw–Hill.
 Friedlin, B. & Gastwirth, J. L. (2000).  Should the median test be retired from general use?  The American Statistician, 54, 161–164.

Statistical tests
Nonparametric statistics